Verkhneblagoveshchenskoye is a rural locality (a selo) in Chigirinsky Selsoviet of Blagoveshchensky District, Amur Oblast, Russia. The population was 703 as of 2018. There are 18 streets.

Geography 
Verkhneblagoveshchenskoye is located on the left bank of the Amur River, 13 km west of Blagoveshchensk (the district's administrative centre) by road. Blagoveshchensk is the nearest rural locality.

References 

Rural localities in Blagoveshchensky District, Amur Oblast